is a passenger railway station  located in the town of Yazu, Yazu District, Tottori Prefecture, Japan.It is operated by the third sector company Wakasa Railway.

Lines
Only local trains stop at this station.

Station layout
The station consists of one ground-level side platform serving a single bi-directional track. There is no station building and the station is unattended.

Adjacent stations

|-
!colspan=5|Wakasa Railway

History
Tokumaru Station opened on March 23, 2002.

Passenger statistics
In fiscal 2018, the station was used by an average of 32 passengers daily.

Surrounding area
Hatto General Athletic Park
Road Station Hatto
Hatto River

See also
List of railway stations in Japan

References

External links 

Railway stations in Tottori Prefecture
Railway stations in Japan opened in 2002
Yazu, Tottori